Abdullah Mucib Avcı (born 31 July 1963) is a UEFA Pro Licensed Turkish manager and a former professional footballer. He is the former manager of Trabzonspor. He has also managed the Turkish national team.  Avcı's coaching career began at İstanbulspor in 1999 as assistant coach before a spell as Galatasaray youth academy chief.

Playing career

After playing for several football clubs including Vefa, Fatih Karagümrük, Rizespor, Kahramanmaraşspor, Bakırköyspor, and Kasımpaşa, he joined Istanbulspor where he spent the longest time and also served as the team captain.

Following the end of his professional football career in 1999, he completed coaching courses and obtained a Professional License.

Managerial career

İstanbulspor
He started his coaching career in Istanbulspor, where he played football for a long time, as one of Ziya Doğan's coaches in the 1999-2000 season. Towards the end of the season, he was brought to the head of the team together with football player-manager Aykut Kocaman and coached the team for 7 matches. He worked as Aykut Kocaman's assistant until 2002. He was appointed as the head of the Istanbulspor A2 team in the 2002-03 season. They came third in the TFF PAF League. In 2003, he took charge as "Youth Development Technical Officer".

Galatasaray U-21
t the start of 2004, he began his coaching career with the Galatasaray U21 team. During his tenure, he trained notable players such as Arda Turan, Aydın Yılmaz, Uğur Uçar, Ferhat Öztorun, Mülayim Erdem, Mehmet Güven, and Cafercan Aksu. In the 2004-2005 season, he guided the team to the PAF League championship title.

Turkey U-17
In October 2004, he was appointed as the head coach of the Turkey under-17 national football team, beginning his tenure with the 2005 European Under-17 Football Championship qualification. Their first international match took place on October 10, 2004, against Armenia, which they won 2-1.

Under his leadership, the team advanced to the elite round of the tournament by finishing in first place in their qualifying group. In the elite round, they won all three matches, but suffered their first defeat against Italy in the tournament. However, they bounced back by defeating England and Belarus to secure the group runner-up spot. In the knockout stage, they defeated Croatia in the semi-finals and Netherlands in the final to become the European Champion for the second time in their history. Tevfik Köse was the top scorer of the tournament, while Nuri Şahin was named the best player. Caner Erkin and Onur Recep Kıvrak were among the team members who would later play for the Turkish national team.

Their success in the championship qualified them to participate in the 2005 FIFA U-17 World Cup. In their first-ever appearance in the tournament, they won all three group matches and reached the quarter-finals, where they eliminated China. However, they were eliminated in the semi-finals after conceding a goal in the 90th minute. In the match for third place, they lost 2-1 to the Netherlands, finishing in fourth place overall. Throughout his one-year tenure, he coached the team in 27 matches, winning 18, drawing 5, and losing only 4 times.

İstanbul BB
In 2006, Avcı left his national team duty and began coaching Istanbul Başakşehir. In the 2006-2007 season, Istanbul Başakşehir finished 2nd in the 1st League and qualified for the Super League in the 2007-2008 season. Despite winning 2-0 against Fenerbahçe in their first game, Istanbul Başakşehir had a rough start to the season. Even though he received an offer from a team that was the champion in the 2007-2008 season, Galatasaray, Avcı chose to remain with Istanbul Başakşehir and declined the offer. Avcı led Istanbul Başakşehir to finish in the 12th place in the 2007-2008 season, 9th place in the 2008-2009 season, 6th place in the 2009-2010 season, and 12th place in the 2010-2011 season in the Super League.

Under Avcı's leadership, Istanbul Başakşehir reached the final of the 2010-2011 Ziraat Turkish Cup. However, in the final match against Beşiktaş, they drew in regular time, and Beşiktaş won the cup as a result of penalties.

Turkey national team

On 17 November 2011, after Guus Hiddink left his job, he was appointed as the coach of the Turkey national football team, which was vacated. A contract was signed with Avcı until May 31, 2015. Having failed with only 6 wins and 4 draws in 18 matches with the national team, Avcı resigned from his position on August 20, 2013, after the rumors of the search for a new coach were not denied.

İstanbul Başakşehir

After his stint as coach of the Turkish national football team, Abdullah Avcı returned to Istanbul Başakşehir in the 2014-15 season. In his first season back, the team finished in 4th place, having achieved 15 wins, 14 draws, and 5 losses in the Super League. In the second season, Başakşehir won 16 matches, drew 11 times, and lost 7 times, again finishing in 4th place.

In the 2016-17 season, Başakşehir had a strong start, eventually finishing in 2nd place behind champions Beşiktaş. The team continued its success in the 2017-18 season, finishing in 3rd place. In the 2018-19 season, Başakşehir finished in 2nd place behind Galatasaray, with a total of 66 points.

During his time with Başakşehir, Avcı helped to establish the team as a strong competitor in the Turkish Super League. He was known for his tactical acumen and ability to develop young players. However, in June 2019, he parted ways with the club.

Beşiktaş

In June 2019, Abdullah Avcı signed a three-year contract with Beşiktaş, one of the biggest football clubs in Turkey. He began his tenure with the team, but his performance and tactics were heavily criticized by the fans who were not satisfied with the team's results and playing style. Despite winning 11 matches at the start of the season, Beşiktaş's performance declined significantly, which led to Avcı's sacking on January 25, 2020, after only seven months as the coach. It is worth noting that the team's disappointing results and the lack of support from the fans played a significant role in Avcı's departure from the club.

Trabzonspor

Abdullah Avcı signed a 2.5-year contract with Trabzonspor on November 10, 2020. Trabzonspor is a football team based in the city of Trabzon, Turkey. They had not won the Super League championship for 36 years until Avcı's tenure. Avcı led Trabzonspor to win the 2020 Turkish Super Cup on January 27, 2021, and later on April 30, 2022, they won the Super League championship three weeks before the end of the 2021-2022 season by drawing 2-2 with Antalyaspor. During his time with Trabzonspor, they had a successful home record, as they went unbeaten for 36 home games. However, on March 4, 2023, Trabzonspor lost their first home game under Avcı's management to Umraniyespor.

On March 7, 2023, Avcı resigned from his position as Trabzonspor coach for personal reasons, leaving behind a successful legacy.

Career statistics
Source:

Club

Managerial statistics

Honours

Player honours
İstanbulspor
TFF Second League: 1991–92

Nişantaşıspor
TFF Second League: 1995–96

Managerial honours

Turkey U-17
UEFA European Under-17 Championship: 2005
FIFA U-17 World Cup (fourth place): 2005

İstanbul Başakşehir
Süper Lig runners-up: 2016–17, 2018–19
Turkish Cup runners-up: 2010–11, 2016–17

Trabzonspor
Süper Kupa: 2020, 2022
Süper Lig: 2021–22

Individual
Süper Lig Manager of the Year: 2021–22

See also
 List of Turkey national football team managers

References

External links
Abdullah Avcı at TFF.org
Abdullah Avcı at Mackolik.com
 

1963 births
Living people
Footballers from Istanbul
Turkish footballers
Association football forwards
Fatih Karagümrük S.K. footballers
Çaykur Rizespor footballers
Kahramanmaraşspor footballers
Bakırköyspor footballers
Kasımpaşa S.K. footballers
İstanbulspor footballers
Vefa S.K. footballers
Turkish football managers
Galatasaray S.K. (football) non-playing staff
Galatasaray A2 football managers
İstanbul Başakşehir F.K. managers
Süper Lig managers
Turkey national football team managers
İstanbulspor managers
Beşiktaş J.K. managers
Trabzonspor managers